Bernd Schumm (born 21 October 1949) is a German football manager.

References

1949 births
Living people
German football managers
TSV 1860 Munich managers
FC Kärnten managers
Austrian Football Bundesliga managers
Indonesia national football team managers
German expatriate football managers
Expatriate football managers in Austria
West German expatriate sportspeople in Austria
Expatriate football managers in Malaysia
German expatriate sportspeople in Malaysia
Expatriate football managers in Indonesia
German expatriate sportspeople in Indonesia
West German football managers
West German expatriate football managers